The esperamicins are chromoprotein enediyne antitumor antibiotics of bacterial origin.  Esperamicin A1 is the most well studied compound in this class.  Esperamcin A1 and the related enediyne calicheamicin are the two most potent antitumor agents known.  The esperamicins are extremely toxic DNA splicing compounds.

Oxygen and active oxygen-radical scavengers have no significant influence upon DNA strand breakage by esperamicin, but the cleavage of DNA by esperamicin is greatly accelerated in the presence of thiol compounds.  The preferential cutting sites of esperamicin are at thymidylate residues, and the frequency of nucleobase attacked (T greater than C greater than A greater than G) is different from that of calicheamicin (C much greater than T greater than A = G), neocarzinostatin (T greater than A greater than C greater than G), or bleomycin (C greater than T greater than A greater than G).

References

Antibiotics
Cancer research
Enediynes
Isopropylamino compounds
Carbamates
Secondary alcohols
Amines
Phenol ethers
Ethers
Thioethers
Alkene derivatives
Anilides
Benzoate esters
Methyl esters
Ketones
Ten-membered rings